Raymond Willard Terrell ( – ) was a professional American football halfback and defensive back who played two seasons for the Cleveland Browns and the Baltimore Colts in the All-America Football Conference (AAFC).

Terrell attended the University of Mississippi, where he played as a halfback on its football team. He joined the U.S. military in 1942 during World War II, and upon his discharge was signed by the Browns, then a team under formation in the new AAFC. Terrell returned an interception 76 yards for a touchdown in the Browns' first game, a team record that stood for 14 years. The Browns went on to win the first AAFC championship, but Terrell was sent to the Colts after the season as part of a league-led effort to distribute talent more evenly among its teams. He was released by the Colts midway through the 1947 season, however, and returned to the Browns. The team proceeded to win a second AAFC championship.

College and professional career

Terrell was born in Mississippi and attended the University of Mississippi, where he played as a halfback on the football team. He entered the U.S. Navy in 1942 during World War II and played football for a team at Naval Air Station Jacksonville, where he was stationed. He moved to the U.S. Marine Corps in 1943 and played for another team at Camp Lejune in North Carolina.

Terrell was signed by the Cleveland Browns of the new All-America Football Conference (AAFC) in 1946. He played on offense and defense for the Browns, and in the team's first game against the Miami Seahawks he returned an interception 76 yards for a touchdown, a team record that stood for 14 years. The Browns won the AAFC's first championship game at the end of the season.

Terrell was one of several Browns players sent to the struggling Baltimore Colts after the season in an attempt to balance talent among the AAFC's teams. He was cut by the Colts in the middle of the 1947 season, however, and tried to regain his position on the Browns' roster after several of the team's halfbacks suffered injuries. "We're going to take a good look at him and if we're convinced that Ray has what he had when he was with us last year we will sign him," Cleveland coach Paul Brown said at the time. Terrell was re-signed by the Browns shortly thereafter and played in several games at the end of the season. The Browns won a second AAFC championship in 1947.

References

Bibliography

External links

 

1919 births
1997 deaths
American football defensive backs
American football halfbacks
Cleveland Browns (AAFC) players
Jacksonville Naval Air Station Flyers football players
Ole Miss Rebels football players
People from Water Valley, Mississippi
Players of American football from Mississippi
United States Navy personnel of World War II
United States Marine Corps personnel of World War II
Baltimore Colts (1947–1950) players